Stathmodera wagneri is a species of beetle in the family Cerambycidae. It was described by Adlbauer in 2006. It is known from Kenya.

References

Apomecynini
Beetles described in 2006